Eric Gonzalez  (born March 24, 1994) is an American soccer player who currently plays for Temecula FC in the National Premier Soccer League.

Youth, amateur, and college career
Gonzalez attended Santiago High School in Corona, California. In 2011, he helped lead Corona to an undefeated season and the squad won the Big VIII League Title — a first for Santiago High School. In 2011 he was selected as Press Enterprise Player of the Year.

Gonzalez’s youth career includes playing in the U.S. Soccer Development Academy with the LA Galaxy and Chivas USA academies. In 2008–09, he made 24 appearances for the LA Galaxy U15/U16 squad and helped the club win the first USSDA U-16 Championship. In 2009 he was part of the U17 US National team located in Bradenton, Florida.

Eric Gonzalez played four years of college soccer for the University of California, Riverside soccer team. While at UCR Eric he played 70 matches (started 57) and obtained the third-most assists. In 2014 Eric helped win the first ever NCAA Big West Title.

In February 2021, Gonzalez joined National Premier Soccer League club Temecula FC.

Professional
In January 2019, Gonzalez signed with Las Vegas Lights FC in the USL Championship.

Gonzalez joined the Oakland Roots in July 2019.

References 

1994 births
Living people
American soccer players
Association football midfielders
Las Vegas Lights FC players
Soccer players from California
Sportspeople from Corona, California
UC Riverside Highlanders men's soccer players
USL Championship players
Cal FC players
Oakland Roots SC players
United Premier Soccer League players
National Premier Soccer League players
National Independent Soccer Association players
Temecula FC players